Henry Earle (1789–1838) was an English surgeon.

Henry Earle may also refer to:

Henry Earle (politician) in 1904 Newfoundland general election
Sir Henry Earle, 3rd Baronet (1854–1939), of the Earle baronets

See also
Harry Earle (1868–1951), footballer
Henry Earle Vaughan (1912–1978), American telephony engineer